Riecken is a German language surname. It stems from the male given name Richard – and may refer to:
Gail Riecken (1945), former Democratic member of the Indiana House of Representatives
Henry Riecken (1917–2012), American psychologist

References 

German-language surnames
Surnames from given names